Master of Kung Fu was a comic book title published by Marvel Comics from 1974 to 1983.

Publication history
The character Shang-Chi first appeared in Special Marvel Edition #15 (December 1973) by Steve Englehart and Jim Starlin. Shang-Chi appeared again in issue #16, and with issue #17 (April 1974) the title was changed to The Hands of Shang-Chi: Master of Kung Fu. Amidst the martial arts craze in the United States in the 1970s, the book became very popular, surviving until issue #125 (June 1983), a run including four Giant-Size issues and one Annual.

The series began by introducing Shang-Chi as a man raised by his father Dr. Fu Manchu to be the ultimate assassin for the would-be world conqueror. In Shang-Chi's first mission, he kills one of his father's old enemies, Dr. Petrie and then learns of Dr. Fu Manchu's true, evil nature. Disillusioned, Shang-Chi swears eternal opposition to his father's ambitions and fights him as an agent of British intelligence, under the orders of Sir Denis Nayland Smith.

The series was an instant sales success. However, Englehart and Starlin would depart the series after their third issue, Master of Kung Fu #17; Englehart left over editorial disputes with then-Marvel editor Roy Thomas, while Starlin, who was unfamiliar with Fu Manchu up until working on the second issue of the series, left out of embarrassment over the racist nature of the Rohmer novels. Despite the title's co-creators' early departure, its success grew once writer Doug Moench and artist Paul Gulacy, began collaborating in issue #22. Comics historian Les Daniels observed that "ingenious writing by Doug Moench and energetic art by Paul Gulacy brought Master of Kung Fu new life". Their critically acclaimed run continued, with short gaps, until #51 when Gulacy was replaced by artist Jim Craig. Craig was later succeeded by Mike Zeck who became the regular penciller in issue #66.

Gulacy was a film buff, and modeled many characters after film stars: Shang-Chi on Bruce Lee, Juliette on Marlene Dietrich, James Larner on Marlon Brando, Clive Reston (often broadly hinted at as being the son of James Bond, as well as the grand-nephew of Sherlock Holmes) occasionally looking like a combination of Basil Rathbone and Sean Connery, and a minor character, Ward Sarsfield (after Arthur Henry Sarsfield Ward, the real-life name of Dr. Fu Manchu's creator Sax Rohmer), resembling David Niven. Moench introduced other film-based characters, including ones modeled after Groucho Marx (Rufus T. Hackstabber) and W. C. Fields (Quigley J. Warmflash).

Moench continued for a long tenure, and the title started to become a fan favorite once again when Mike Zeck (on pencils) and Gene Day (on inks) began their long run on the book. Master of Kung Fu started receiving Gulacy-level acclaim when Gene Day took over penciling in issue #100 (1981). Despite critical success, sales lagged. Day died of a heart attack after finishing issue #120, and Moench left the book after #122. The character's long-running battle with his father ended with #118 and with the main storyline resolved, the book was cancelled with issue #125, as Shang-Chi retired to a passive life as a fisherman in a Chinese village. In 2010, Comics Bulletin ranked Moench's work on Master of Kung-Fu with artists Gulacy, Mike Zeck, and Day sixth on its list of the "Top 10 1970s Marvels".

In 1988, Marvel published a new Master of Kung Fu story in Marvel Comics Presents #1-8. It reunited Shang-Chi with most of the original supporting cast and featured Moench again writing, with Tom Grindberg penciling.

Since its cancellation, the Master of Kung Fu title would be briefly revived on a couple of occasions as the one-shot issue Master of Kung Fu: Bleeding Black (1990), and the MAX miniseries Master of Kung Fu: Hellfire Apocalypse (2002), with artist Paul Gulacy on art again.

In 2015, the Master of Kung Fu title was revived as part of the Secret Wars storyline. Written by Haden Blackman and illustrated by Dalibor Talajic, the four-issue miniseries is a wuxia-inspired story that takes place in the Battleworld domain of K'un-Lun and centers around Shang-Chi in his fight to overthrow his despotic father, Emperor Zheng Zu.

In 2017, after a 34-year gap, Master of Kung Fu released its 126th issue as part of the Marvel Legacy relaunch.  The one-shot issue was written by mixed martial artist CM Punk and illustrated once again by Talajic.

The Hands of Shang-Chi, Master of Kung Fu

Supporting characters
The series, especially as written by Doug Moench was notable for its strong supporting characters. As they evolved, these characters became nearly as integral to the series as Shang-Chi himself:

 Dr. Fu Manchu is portrayed in a manner mostly consistent with the Sax Rohmer novels. He is a brilliant and calculating master villain who aspires to rule the world.  He is the leader of the Si-Fan, which he later incorporates into the Order of the Golden Dawn, a single organization made up of secret societies and cults from around the world. As the series progresses the character deteriorates, gradually losing his nobler qualities. By the end of the series he is a pathetic figure, reduced to stealing his children's blood to preserve his immortality and greedily lapping up the blood of his son's clone out of desperation. His true identity is later revealed to be Zheng Zu, an ancient Chinese sorcerer. Other notable aliases include: Mr. Han, the Father, the Devil Doctor, Chang Hu, The Ghost, Comte de Saint Germain and Wang Yu-Seng.
 Sir Denis Nayland Smith is Fu Manchu's nemesis from the novels. In the comics he retains this role, his obsession with the villain often bringing out the dark side of his own character. In his better moments, he becomes a sort of surrogate father to Shang-Chi. Ultimately, he is too caught up in what Shang-Chi calls 'games of deceit and death' and fails in this role. The relationship the two finally form is that of two flawed characters who feel strong friendship in spite of their deep differences.
 Fah Lo Suee is the daughter of Fu Manchu and is the final character from the novels to appear in the comic book. She is a villainess in her own right, though she is not interested in the misguided idealism of Fu Manchu. She is a pragmatist, seeking the best way to power and as such, shifts alliances often. Usually she is an enemy of Shang-Chi and his friends, but sometimes she is an ally.  She initially leads her own faction of the Si-Fan against her father, and later becomes leader of Oriental Expeditors and the Golden Daggers. When last seen, she had become a highly ranked official in MI-6. She later resumes her criminal activities, working under the alias the Cursed Lotus.  She is currently known as Zheng Bao Yu.
 Black Jack Tarr is Smith's aide-de-camp and a powerful giant of a man with a gruff manner. Though he is initially an enemy of Shang-Chi, the two become close friends over time. He exhibits the most bigoted traits of any character and invariably addresses Shang-Chi as "Chinaman", rather than using his name. It is one of the successes of the series that readers are drawn to feel for Tarr while the writing never turns a blind eye to his politically incorrect attitudes. Over time, Tarr drops his bigoted attitude and his relationship with Shang-Chi evolves into genuine friendship. By the time of The Deadly Hands of Kung Fu (vol. 2), Tarr has become the new director of MI-6.
 Clive Reston is a British spy who resembles a younger and more vulnerable version of James Bond. Where Bond is a successful womanizer and seems unaffected by heavy drinking, Reston struggles with alcoholism and a romantic rivalry with Shang-Chi. The resemblance to Bond is intentional. Reston's dialogue makes it clear that he is both Bond's son and the grand-nephew of Sherlock Holmes. By the time of Wisdom, he is the director of MI6 and has been knighted; he believes MI-13 to be a doomed organisation and that MI6 should handle the "weird happenings", to the extent of keeping things from the rival agency. After this attitude helped lead to a Martian invasion, he has become more cooperative, and worked with MI-13 and MI5 against Dracula.
 Leiko Wu is introduced as a femme fatale like those in the Bond films. She is a beautiful Chinese-British woman who is torn between her history with Reston and her growing attraction to Shang-Chi. Though initially sarcastic and self-possessed to the point of arrogance, her relationship with her new lover causes her to become more contemplative.
 M'Nai / Midnight is an African agent of Fu Manchu and an elite assassin of the Si-Fan.  As a child, M'Nai's village was raided by British forces due to it being one of Fu Manchu's many headquarters. Fu Manchu, impressed with the orphaned child's stoic nature, adopted and raised him alongside his son Shang-Chi.  Due to his badly disfigured face, he always wore a mask. Fu Manchu sent him to kill Shang-Chi after his son turned his back on him, even though Shang-Chi and M'Nai considered themselves brothers. Midnight died as a result of their second battle, but was later resurrected as Midnight Sun by the alien Kree in a cloned body and gifted with cosmic powers strong enough to challenge the Silver Surfer. After a couple of battles with the Surfer, he settled down to a peaceful life in the Blue Area of the Moon, where he was accepted by the Inhumans. This would not last long, as M'Nai would later resume his criminal activities to carry out his father's legacy and fulfill his thirst for vengeance against his former brother.  
 Rufus T. Hackstabber is a memorable character who appeared only twice in the series; he keeps referring to Shang-Chi as "Chang-Shee". The character strongly resembles Groucho Marx and his fast-paced nonsensical patter plays well off Shang-Chi's laconic seriousness. Hackstabber's name is a play on Rufus T. Firefly, Groucho's character in Duck Soup.
 Shen Kuei / the Cat is a master thief whose skill in martial arts equals Shang-Chi's. The meaning of the character's name is both similar and opposite to Shang-Chi's name. He is a sort of mirror image, a 'good bad guy' in opposition to Shang-Chi's 'bad good guy'. While they share mutual respect, the two always find themselves in opposition. He has recently appeared in Cable & Deadpool working as a mercenary for Cable. He has also defeated Deadpool, who looks at him as a Rock God among mercenaries and has also referred to him as "the Keith Moon of the spy trade" and "the Justin Timberlake of the Cherry Pop Club".
 Rufus "Super Midnight" Carter is an African-American kickboxing champion and antiques dealer who secretly works for the CIA. He is a light-hearted character who helps to draw out Shang-Chi's sense of whimsy in his several appearances. Carter's unusual nickname is accounted for by his origin. A colleague challenged Doug Moench to write a story using "Carter's Super Midnight" (the name of a brand of carbon paper) as a title.
 Xi-Shan Hao / Shadow Slasher is a Hong Kong assassin and enemy of Shang-Chi that first appeared in Master of Kung Fu #98 (1981), and was created by Doug Moench, Mike Zeck, and Gene Day.
 Li-Peng Kai / Kogar is a Hong Kong smuggler, gang leader, and enemy of Shang-Chi that first appeared in Master of Kung Fu #63 (1978), and was created by Doug Moench and Jim Craig.

Master of Kung Fu: Battleworld

This series, written by Haden Blackman and illustrated by Dalibor Talajic, was part of the Secret Wars series which takes place in the Battleworld domain of K'un-Lun. Based on the mystical city of the same name from Earth-15513, it is a wuxia-inspired domain in which its inhabitants are martial artists with mystical abilities and techniques. Aside from Shang-Chi, the series includes reimaginings of characters from the original Master of Kung Fu series, as well as others from other Marvel comics.

Characters
 Shang-Chi: The "Rising Spirit", he is the son of Emperor Zheng Zu and hailed as one of the greatest martial artists of the kingdom. Wanted for the murder of his father's rival, Lord Tuan, the previous master of the Iron Fist. Much like his mainstream counterpart, he is raised by his villainous father to become his personal weapon, but renounces his father after murdering an innocent old man. However, while Shang-Chi from the original stories is portrayed as reserved and introspective, this Shang-Chi starts out as a bitter and cynical drunkard, albeit noble and compassionate; over time, he regains his resolve and fighting spirit. He is also accompanied by his pet dog, whom his father wanted to drown for being the runt of its litter. Although born to one of his many forgotten concubines, Zheng Zu presents a romanticized and fictional version of Shang-Chi's conception: he was created with a heart forged from the steel of the Ebon Blade melted in the Eternal Flame, the Infinity Gems for eyes and the Cosmic Cube for his mind, baptized in the River Styx and brought to life by the ashes of a phoenix. Aside from mastering nine of the 10 techniques of the Ten Rings, Shang-Chi later learns and masters his student Kitten's technique of intangibility (thus becoming his namesake, a "Rising Spirit") and develops a new technique called the Gorgon's Eye that turns his opponents into stone. After defeating Zu in the Thirteen Chambers, Shang-Chi becomes the new emperor of K'un-Lun.    
 Zheng Zu: An amalgam of Zheng Zu and the Mandarin from the mainstream continuity, he is the master of the Ten Rings and the Emperor of K'un-Lun, a position he has held for nearly 100 years. A cruel and ruthless despot, Zheng Zu rules the kingdom with an iron fist, even going as far as killing his own students for their failures. To maintain his rule, he exiled his son to cover up his involvement in his rival Lord Tuan's murder and planned to have all the remaining masters killed. Despite his nefarious schemes, Zheng Zu is also a proud and honorable warrior, as he abides by the rules of the Thirteen Chambers when Shang-Chi enters the tournament. After Shang-Chi defeats him with the Gorgon's Eye, his reign is finally brought to an end.  
 Rand-K'ai: Based on Danny Rand, he is the sheriff of K'un-Lun and current master of the Iron Fist. Hunts after Shang-Chi for the murder of his beloved master, Lord Tuan, although he suspects the Emperor, whom he is forced to serve, to be involved. Despite his animosity towards Shang-Chi, he is shown to be just and honorable. Initially entering the Thirteen Chambers to usurp Zheng Zu, he later sets his sights on Shang-Chi to bring him to justice. After hearing the truth from Red Sai about his mentor's death, Rand-K'ai cures Shang-Chi of the poison in his body and lets him fight his father in the Thirteenth Chamber.   
 Red Sai: Based on Elektra, she is the sai-wielding master of the Red Hand and the former lover of Shang-Chi. Due to the sacrifice made by the first master of the Red Hand, Red Sai is forced to serve as Emperor Zu's personal assassin. It is revealed that Zu had sent to her to assassinate Lord Tuan but she ultimately failed; to spare Red Sai and her students from the Emperor's wrath, Shang-Chi killed Tuan.  
 Kitten: Based on Kitty Pryde, she is an outcast who was expelled from her school for failing to master an advanced technique, which left her permanently intangible. She later becomes a member of Shang-Chi's Lowest Caste school. She accompanies Shang-Chi in all of his fights in the Thirteen Chambers, due to her condition preventing her from interfering. Shang-Chi reveals that he was able to master the technique Kitten failed to do, which plays a vital role in his fight against Zheng Zu.
 Tuan: Based on the character of the same name, Lord Tuan was the previous master of the Iron Fist and Zheng Zu's hated rival. Due to his kind heart, Tuan opposed Zu for his cruelty towards K'un-Lun's magical races and even his own students, and fought him repeatedly in the Thirteen Chambers. Although unsuccessful, he humiliated the Emperor by making bleed in their last fight, leading a vengeful Zu to orchestrate his murder. Red Sai was initially sent to assassinate him but failed, Shang-Chi killed Tuan while he was meditating in order to protect her from his father. Tuan's murder leads his student Rand-K'ai to avenge his death.
 Lock: Based on Lockheed, he is a small, fire-breathing Chinese dragon and a member of Kitten's band of outcasts. He later joins Shang-Chi's Lowest Caste school. 
 Callisto: Based on the character of the same name, she is the original leader of the band of outcasts that approaches Shang-Chi for training. When they request for him to teach them the Ten Ring techniques, Shang-Chi refuses and mocks Callisto for her missing eye. An enraged Callisto betrays the group and gives up Shang-Chi's whereabouts to the Emperor in exchange for membership in the Ten Rings; this ultimately leads to her former friend's Cy's death at the hands of Laughing Skull and Shang-Chi and the others escape capture. When Shang-Chi emerges victorious from the Thirteen Chambers, a remorseful Callisto is seen with the remaining Ten Rings members, who pledge their loyalty to the new Emperor.     
 Sarah: Based on Marrow, she is a young outcast with bones protruding over her body due to her failure in mastering the Marrow technique. She later becomes a member of Shang-Chi's Lowest Caste school.
 Caliban: Based on the character of the same name, he is a member of Callisto's band of outcasts. Despite being rejected from many masters due to his simple-mindedness, he possesses a keen photographic memory. He later becomes a member of Shang-Chi's Lowest Caste school.  
 Rahne: Based on Wolfsbane, she is a member of Callisto's band of outcasts who was expelled from the Wolf Clan for falling in love with Cy, a member from a rival school. Due to her training being incomplete, she is permanently stuck in her wolf-human hybrid form. She later becomes a member of Shang-Chi's Lowest Caste school.   
 Cy: Based on Cypher, he is a member of Callisto's band of outcasts who lost his right arm when protecting his lover Rahne from her former master, due to them being from rival schools. After Callisto betrays the group to the Emperor, their hideout is raided by Rand-K'ai, Red Sai and Laughing Skull, who capture the outcasts to draw Shang-Chi out of hiding. When Cy attempts to save Rahne from Rand-K'ai, Laughing Skull kills him, devastating Rahne and the others. Although Shang-Chi helps the remaining members escape, he is guilt-ridden for not preventing Cy's death and agrees to make the outcasts his students and end his father's rule to protect them. 
 Razor Fist: Based on the character of the same name, he is a student of the Ten Rings and is proficient in the Mortal Blade technique. When he, Typhus and Nightwind are clearing a park of vagrants, they encounter Shang-Chi, who they mistake for a drunken bum. After finding out his true identity, Razor Fist and the others attempt to collect the bounty on his head, only to be easily bested by the Master of Kung Fu and the outcasts. As punishment for his failure to capture his son, Zheng Zu cuts off Razor Fist's hands with his own version of the Mortal Blade technique. He later replaces his severed hands with blades, now resembling his mainstream counterpart.    
 Typhus: Based on Typhoid Mary, she is a student of the Ten Rings and is proficient in the Flame Fist technique. When she, Razor Fist and Nightwind attempt to collect the bounty on Shang-Chi's head, they are easily defeated by the Master of Kung Fu and the outcasts.  
 Nightwind: Based on the character of the same name, she is a student of the Ten Rings and is proficient in the Nightbringer technique. When she, Razor Fist and Typhus attempt to collect the bounty on Shang-Chi's head, they are easily defeated by the Master of Kung Fu and the outcasts.  
 Laughing Skull: Based on the Taskmaster, he is a sadistic member of the Ten Rings, whose face is hidden by his namesake mask. Laughing Skull is shown to be proficient in the Zero Touch and Flame Fist techniques, as well as swordsmanship. He, Rand-K'ai and Red Sai are sent by the Emperor to hunt down Shang-Chi. After Callisto gives up Shang-Chi's whereabouts, the three raid the outcasts' hideout and capture them to draw Shang-Chi out of hiding. Despite Rand-K'ai's orders to spare the prisoners, Laughing Skull unhesitatingly kills Cy when he attempts to rescue his lover Rahne, much to Rand-K'ai's anger. Shang-Chi subsequently attacks Laughing Skull and uses the Nightbringer technique to help the others escape.   
 Norrin: Based on Norrin Radd, he is the personal herald of Emperor Zu. It is unknown if Norrin is a student of the Ten Rings or simply just a servant to the throne.  
 Shiro: Implied to be based on Sunfire due to his name and association with fire. Razor Fist is sent by Zheng Zu to have his stumps cauterized by Shiro after Razor Fist's arms are cut off by the Emperor. It is unknown if Shiro is a student of the Ten Rings or simply a servant to the throne.
 Lester: Based on Bullseye, he is a retired assassin who now works as a farmer. After falling out of favor with the Emperor, Lester attempted to hunt down Shang-Chi to retain his good standing, but gave up after failing to track him. Lester is brutally interrogated by Red Sai, Laughing Skull and Rand-K'ai for Shang-Chi's whereabouts, but they ultimately come up empty-handed due to the former assassin's failure.  
 T'Challa: Based on the character of the same name, he is the master of the Panther Clan and has a passion for science and art. He is defeated by Shang-Chi in the Thirteen Chambers.
 Ava: Based on the character of the same name, she is the master of the House of the Jade Tiger. Ava inherited the title of master from her brother Hector, who highly respected Shang-Chi. She is defeated by Shang-Chi in the Thirteen Chambers.  
 Lord Namor: Based on the character of the same name, he is the master of the Halls of Atlantis. He is defeated by Shang-Chi in the Thirteen Chambers.  
 Drew: Based on Jessica Drew, she is the four-armed master and weaver of the Spider Cult, which she claims is a religion. She is defeated by Shang-Chi in the Thirteen Chambers.  
 Karnak: Based on the character of the same name, he is the master of the House of Terrigen Mists. Much like his mainstream counterpart, Karnak is a highly skilled martial artist and can detect his opponents' weaknesses, although it is unknown if these abilities are taught by the Terrigen Mists or simply exclusive to him. He is defeated by Shang-Chi in the Thirteen Chambers.  
 Creed: A female version of Sabretooth, she is the master of the Tooth and Claw school. Creed appears to have a grudge against Rand-K'ai, a nod to the mainstream Sabretooth's debut in the comics as an antagonist to Iron Fist. She is defeated by Shang-Chi in the Thirteen Chambers.
 Spector: A female version of the Moon Knight, she is the master of the Faces of the Moon school. Spector is accompanied by an unseen entity, heavily implied to be Khonshu. She is defeated by Shang-Chi in the Thirteen Chambers.  
 Lady Mandarin: Based on Psylocke, she is the master of the School of Spirit Blades. She is defeated by Shang-Chi in the Thirteen Chambers.

Setting 
Centuries before the start of the series, the great masters of every martial arts school warred with each other until the masters from the Ten Rings and the Iron Fist decided to end the bloodshed by hosting a tournament every 13 years in the Thirteen Chambers to decide who the next Emperor of K'un-Lun would be, with the losing masters swearing fealty to the victor. Each of these schools and their abilities are modeled off a Marvel comics character from the mainstream continuity:
 The Ten Rings: a martial arts school that has the highest authority in K'un-Lun due to its master, Emperor Zheng Zu, winning the previous Thirteen Chambers for almost 100 years. Its students include Razor Fist, Typhus, Nightwind, Laughing Skull, and later Callisto. Shang-Chi was a student before swearing off his loyalty after his exile. Each of the 10 techniques used by the school's members are based on the abilities of the Mandarin's ten rings:
Mortal Blade: Makes the user's arms razor sharp. For Razor Fist, his arms simply glow red, but for Shang-Chi and Zheng Zu, their arms transform into literal blades. This is the only technique not based on any of the Mandarin's rings; instead it is an homage to the bladed limbs of Razor Fist, a longtime foe of Shang-Chi from the mainstream continuity.
Nightbringer: Lets the user summon and control darkness. Based on the Nightbringer ring.
Zero Touch: Lets the user emit waves of cold and ice. Based on the Zero ring.
Flame Fist: Lets the user generate and control heat and fire. Based on the Incandescence ring.
Shocking Palm: Lets the user send bursts of lightning onto an opponent. Based on the Lightning ring.
Long Breath: Lets the user summon vortexes of wind. Based on the Spin ring.
Daemon's Eye: Lets the user emit powerful bright lights that can blind others. Based on the Daimonic ring.
Lost Hope: a telepathic ability that forces the user's psionic energy onto others. Based on the Liar ring.
Remaker: Turns the user's flesh as hard as diamond. Based on the Remaker ring.
Spectral Touch: A lethal technique that can kill anyone the user touches. Based on the Spectral ring. It is the only technique Shang-Chi was not taught by Zheng Zu, who is shown to be its only practitioner.
 The Iron Fist: the first martial arts school of K'un-Lun. Founded by a farmer named Quan Yaozu (named after the character of the same name, who was also the first Iron Fist of the mainstream continuity), the Iron Fist is dedicated to protecting the weak and are the main rivals of the Ten Rings school. They were the first school to win the Thirteen Chambers when a previous great master became the first Emperor of K'un-Lun, until he was usurped by another master. Much like the mainstream comics, students of the Iron Fist can channel their chi into their hands and feet, encasing them in a supernatural glow that allows them to strike targets with superhuman hardness and impact while protecting them from pain and injury; the Iron Fist can also be used to dispel darkness and heal injuries and poison. Lord Tuan was the previous master of the Iron Fist until he was succeeded by his student Rand-K'ai following his death.  
 The Lowest Caste: a group of outcasts shunned and rejected by the martial arts schools and K'un-Lun society that take in Shang-Chi during his exile. They are loosely based on the Morlocks and the New Mutants. To qualify for the Thirteen Chambers, Shang-Chi represents the group as its great master, also giving them their school name as well. After Shang-Chi's victory, the Lowest Caste are spared from execution and are accepted by K'un-Lun's citizens. Its members include Kitten, Lock, Sarah, Caliban, Rahne and formerly Callisto and Cy.
 The Red Hand: based on the Hand, it is a martial arts school made up of ninjas skilled in many mystical abilities, including assassination, stealth and acrobatics. Due to its first master sacrificing her life to protect her lover, Quan Yaozu, master of the Iron Fist and first Emperor of K'un-Lun, the Red Hand devotes itself to the throne, regardless of whoever sits on it, and refuses to participate in the Thirteen Chambers. The school is led by Red Sai, whose master is based on the Kingpin. A character resembling Nightcrawler is shown as a member as well.
 The Panther Clan: A martial arts school whose members are inspired by and have similar superhuman abilities to the Black Panther. They are led by T'Challa, whose master is based on T'Chaka.
 The House of the Jade Tiger: A martial arts school whose members are inspired by and have similar superhuman abilities to the White Tiger. They are led by Ava, who succeeded her brother Hector as its master.
 The Halls of Atlantis: A martial arts school inspired by the Atlanteans from the mainstream continuity whose members can breathe and become stronger underwater. They are led by Lord Namor and include Namorita as a member.    
 The Spider Cult: A martial arts school inspired by characters associated with Spider-Man whose members, "Weavers", can use spider-like abilities, including growing extra limbs. They are led by Drew.  
 The House of Terrigen Mists: A martial arts school inspired by the Inhumans, hidden in the wilds of ancient K'un-Lun. While never explained what the school teaches, its master, Karnak, is shown with the ability to sense an opponent's weak points, which he carries from the mainstream continuity. A character resembling Crystal is shown to be a member as well.  
 The Tooth and Claw: A martial arts school inspired by the Lupines whose members can grow fangs and claws. They are led by Creed.  
 The Faces of the Moon: A martial arts school whose members are inspired by and have similar supernatural abilities to Khonshu. They are led by Spector.
 The School of Spirit Blades: A martial arts school inspired by Psylocke, whose members can manifest "spirit blades" made up of psychic energy. They are led by Lady Mandarin.  
 The Wolf Clan: A martial arts school whose members can shapeshift into wolf-like forms. Rahne was a former member of this school until she was cast out for falling in love with Cy, a member of a rival school.
 Several other unnamed schools exist in K'un-Lun as well, including the ones Kitten and Cy were expelled from, and a school whose members are based on the Punisher.

Collected editions 
 Master of Kung Fu: Battleworld collects Master of Kung Fu (vol. 2) #1-4 and Ronin #2, 112 pages, January 2016, 
 Shang-Chi: Master of Kung-Fu Omnibus
 Vol. 1 collects Special Marvel Edition #15-16, Master of Kung Fu #17-37, Giant-Size Master of Kung Fu #1-4, Giant-Size Spider-Man #2 and material from Iron Man Annual #4, 696 pages, June 2016, 
 Vol. 2 collects Master of Kung Fu #38-70 and Master of Kung Fu Annual #1, 664 pages, September 2016, 
 Vol. 3 collects Master of Kung Fu #71-101 and What If? #16, 696 pages, March 2017, 
 Vol. 4 collects Master of Kung Fu #102-125, Marvel Comics Presents #1-8 and Master of Kung Fu: Bleeding Black #1, 748 pages, October 2017, 
Epic Collection
 Master of Kung Fu Epic Collection: Weapon of the Soul collects Special Marvel Edition #15–16, Master of Kung Fu #17–28, Giant-Size Master of Kung Fu #1–4, Giant-Size Spider-Man #2 and Iron Man Annual #4	480, March 14, 2018, 
 Master of Kung Fu Epic Collection: Fight Without Pity collects  Master of Kung Fu #29–53; Master of Kung Fu Annual #1, June 26, 2019, 
 Master of Kung Fu Epic Collection: Traitors to the Crown collects Master of Kung Fu #54–79, November 10, 2020,

References

Comics by Doug Moench
Comics by Steve Englehart
Marvel Comics titles
Shang-Chi titles